"Waves" is a song by American singer Normani featuring 6lack. Normani first performed the song at a Tidal X concert in Brooklyn in October 2018. The song premiered on Beats 1 and was released on November 15, 2018. The music video for "Waves" was released in February 2019 and won the 2019 MTV Video Music Award for Best R&B Video.

Background
Normani originally performed the song without 6lack at a Tidal X concert in Brooklyn on October 23, 2018. Billboard reported on the performance, calling it "slow-churning" and its hook "intoxicating". Covering the concert, Paper called the song an upcoming single in October. The singer announced the song on Twitter and shared its cover art on November 14. "Waves" premiered on Beats 1 and was released as a single on November 15. Normani explained to Zane Lowe on Beats 1 why she chose to work with 6lack:

"Waves" was serviced to radio and in January 2019 ranked No. 73 on the Mediabase rhythmic format. On February 9, 2019, Normani posted a teaser of the music video on social media, announcing that it will premiere on February 12. On March 13, 2019, Normani and 6Lack performed the song on The Tonight Show Starring Jimmy Fallon. MTV praised the performance. Questlove, who leads The Tonight Show band, later stated, "After some 2000 summed odd episodes of Late Night/Tonight I’ll say that Normani’s performance on #FallonTonight was one of the most impressive performance debuts".

Composition
Musically, 'Waves" is an "alluring and hypnotic" R&B slow jam. The song opens with "atmospheric" synths, before being met with skittering percussion and throbbing bass bombs." Lyrically, Normani refers to a relationship she finds herself going back to on the song, singing "When I have you, wanna leave you/If you're gone, that's when I need you." Originally, the pre-chorus for the single, as well as some lyrics, were different, however it was changed once 6lack began working on the single.

Critical reception
Jon Blistein of Rolling Stone called the track a "brooding break-up song", saying that Normani and 6lack both give "deft vocal performances". Rap-Up called the single a "seductive jam." Brittany Spanos, also writing for Rolling Stone, called the single "worthy of the type of star Normani sees herself as and wants to be." While MTV stated “Their voices sound heavenly together, both butter smooth and simply lush on the ear.”

Accolades

Awards and nominations

Music video
The music video was released on February 12, 2019, and was directed by Emil Nava. The video's opening sequence features Normani waking up on a deserted planet next to a white Beats Pill. She performs in various dance sequences in a sheer body suit and slicked-back bun, accompanied by dancers wearing identical costumes. The video is also intercut with scenes of her caressing a starry silhouette on a diving board in the sky, lying on a mattress floating on the surface of a dark ocean, floating underwater, and disappearing into a star field. 6LACK then appears on the surface of the Moon as he and Normani embrace while shooting stars fly past. The video ends with them holding hands as they lie on mattress floating in the middle of a submerged crater as the camera zooms out.

James Dinh for IHeartRadio described the collaboration as "brooding", adding that the clip feels "psychedelic" and "worth the wait".

Personnel
Adapted from Tidal.

 Normani Kordei Hamilton – vocals, composition
 6lack – vocals, composition
 Felicia Ferraro – composition
 Mary Weitz – composition
 Jonah Christian – production, composition, bass, guitar, keyboards, programming, synthesizer
 Tayla Parx – vocal production
 Colin Leonard – master engineering
 Tim McClain – mix engineering, record engineering
 Andrew Keller – engineering assistance
 JT Gagarin – record engineering

Charts

References

2018 singles
2018 songs
Normani songs
6lack songs
Songs written by Paul McCartney
Songs written by Ilya Salmanzadeh
Songs written by Normani